Hylomantis granulosa, also known as the granular leaf frog, is a species of frog in the subfamily Phyllomedusinae. It is endemic to eastern Brazil where it is only known from Amargosa, Bahia, and Recife; the type locality is the Zoo Botanical Park Dois Irmãos in Recife.
Its natural habitats are lowland forests, including secondary forests. Breeding takes place in streams. Threats to this species are related to habitat loss.

References

Hylomantis
Endemic fauna of Brazil
Amphibians of Brazil
Taxonomy articles created by Polbot
Taxobox binomials not recognized by IUCN